Jang Seung-eop (1843 – 1897) (commonly known by his pen name Owon) was a painter of the late Joseon Dynasty in Korea. His life was dramatized in the award-winning 2002 film Chi-hwa-seon directed by Im Kwon-taek. He was one of the few painters to hold a position of rank in the Joseon court.

Biography
Growing up as an orphan, Owon learned painting while staying at another family's house.  He first had the opportunity to paint extensively when he was taken into the household of aristocrat Yi Ung-heon in his 20s.  Later, his talent became widely known, and he painted extensively in all genres of the time, including landscapes, flower paintings, and paintings of daily life.

Together with the earlier painters Danwon and Hyewon, Owon is remembered today as one of the "Three Wons" of Joseon-period painting.

Gallery

See also

Korean art
Korean culture
Korean painting
List of Korean painters

1843 births
1897 deaths
19th-century Korean painters